Edward Hutson   (1871–1936) was a long-serving Anglican Bishop of Antigua from 1911 until his death and, from 1921, Archbishop of the West Indies.

Hutson was educated at Codrington College and Durham University and ordained in 1896. He was curate of All Saints' Antigua and then the rector of St Paul's St Croix. During this time he was also a canon of St John's Cathedral and an examining chaplain to Walter Farrar, Bishop of Antigua, until he was himself appointed to the position.

References

1871 births
Alumni of Codrington College
20th-century Anglican bishops in the Caribbean
Anglican bishops of Antigua
Anglican archbishops of the West Indies
20th-century Anglican archbishops
Companions of the Order of St Michael and St George
1936 deaths